Noushig Eloyan is a Canadian politician, who served on the Montreal City Council from 1994 to 2009 and ran for the Canadian Parliament for the electoral riding of Ahuntsic in the May 2, 2011 elections as a member of the federal Liberal Party of Canada.

Background

Eloyan was born in Syria and immigrated to Canada in 1976. She is of Armenian descent.

Member of the Bourque administration

In 1994 she ran for a seat on the city council under the Vision Montreal banner in the district of Acadie.  She won with 45 per cent of the vote as Pierre Bourque became Mayor of Montreal.  She served as Montreal's chairperson of the executive committee from 1994 to 1998.  She was re-elected in 1998 with 58 per cent of the vote.

Leader of the Opposition

Even though Vision Montreal lost the 2001 election, Eloyan managed to win re-election as city councillor.  She ran in the district of Cartierville and received 53% of the vote.  She served as borough mayor of Ahuntsic-Cartierville until 2005.  She was re-elected to the council with 49% of the ballots in that same year in the district of Bordeaux-Cartierville.

When Bourque retired from politics in May 2006, Eloyan became Leader of the Opposition.

In May 2008, she confirmed her desire to leave office as leader of the opposition in Montreal and was replaced by Benoit Labonté, then borough mayor of Ville-Marie. She did not run again in the 2009 Montreal municipal election, and her seat was taken by Harout Chitilian of Union Montréal.

Electoral record (incomplete)

|-

Footnotes

Living people
Montreal city councillors
Canadian people of Armenian descent
Women municipal councillors in Canada
Women in Quebec politics
Candidates in the 2011 Canadian federal election
Quebec candidates for Member of Parliament
People from Ahuntsic-Cartierville
21st-century Canadian women politicians
Liberal Party of Canada candidates for the Canadian House of Commons
Year of birth missing (living people)
Syrian people of Armenian descent